Chalcophorotaenia is a genus of beetles in the family Buprestidae, containing the following species:

 Chalcophorotaenia australasiae (Saunders, 1872)
 Chalcophorotaenia beltanae (Blackburn, 1894)
 Chalcophorotaenia castanea (Carter, 1916)
 Chalcophorotaenia cerata (Kerremans, 1891)
 Chalcophorotaenia cuprascens (Waterhouse, 1875)
 Chalcophorotaenia elongata (Waterhouse, 1875)
 Chalcophorotaenia exilis (Blackburn, 1894)
 Chalcophorotaenia laeta (Waterhouse, 1881)
 Chalcophorotaenia longicollis (Kerremans, 1900)
 Chalcophorotaenia martinii (Saunders, 1872)
 Chalcophorotaenia pedifera (Blackburn, 1891)
 Chalcophorotaenia quadriimpressa (Waterhouse, 1875)
 Chalcophorotaenia sphinx (Obenberger, 1916)
 Chalcophorotaenia violacea (Carter, 1915)

References

Buprestidae genera